A. J. Wynder (born September 11, 1964) is an American college basketball coach and the current  head coach of the Nassau Community College men's basketball team. A former professional basketball player, during his playing career Wynder was a member of the United States national basketball team that won a silver medal at the 1995 Pan American Games and was a member of the Boston Celtics of the National Basketball Association during the 1990–91 season. A native of Long Island, he grew up in Freeport, New York.

College career
Wynder attended Fairfield University where he was selected a Second Team All-MAAC in 1987 and helped lead the Stags to back-to-back MAAC Championships and NCAA Tournament appearances in 1986 and 1987.

Professional career
Wynder played for the Boston Celtics in National Basketball Association during the 1990–91 NBA season. He also played 10 seasons in the Continental Basketball Association from 1987 to 1989 and from 1990 to 1996.

USA Basketball career
Wynder helped USA win a silver medal in the 1995 Pan American Games in Mar del Plata, Argentina.  During the tournament Wynder set the US basketball record for 3-point shooting accuracy hitting 8-of-12 or 66.7 percent of his 3-point shots.

Coaching career
Wynder is the fourth head coach of the Nassau Community College men's basketball team.  During his 11 seasons coaching NCC, Wynder has compiled an overall 208-86 record. In 2002, Wynder was named Region XV Coach of the Year. Coach Wynder has led NCC to three title games ('02, '06, '07) of the Region XV (Div. III) championship.

Wynder also served as a player/assistant coach while playing for the Tri City Chinooks in Washington state from 1993 to 1995.

References

External links
 Nassau Community College Head Men’s Basketball Coach Profile
 Fairfield University Athletic Hall of Fame Profile
 CBA Quad City Thunder Playing Card

1964 births
Living people
American men's basketball coaches
American men's basketball players
Basketball coaches from New York (state)
Basketball players at the 1995 Pan American Games
Basketball players from New York City
Boston Celtics players
Cedar Rapids Silver Bullets players
Connecticut Pride players
Continental Basketball Association coaches
Fairfield Stags men's basketball players
Junior college men's basketball coaches in the United States
Medalists at the 1995 Pan American Games
Pan American Games medalists in basketball
Pan American Games silver medalists for the United States
People from Freeport, New York
Player-coaches
Point guards
Quad City Thunder players
San Diego Wildcards players
Sioux Falls Skyforce (CBA) players
Sportspeople from Nassau County, New York
Sportspeople from the Bronx
Tri-City Chinook players
UMass Minutemen basketball players
Undrafted National Basketball Association players
United States men's national basketball team players
Wyoming Wildcatters players
Yakima Sun Kings players